Solidago tarda, commonly known as Atlantic goldenrod, is a rare North American species of goldenrod in the family Asteraceae. It is found along the Atlantic coastal plain from New Jersey and Alabama, though nowhere very common.

Description
Solidago tarda is  a perennial herb up to 180 cm (6 feet) tall, with a branching underground caudex or rhizomes. Leaves are elliptic or egg-shaped, up to 35 cm (14 inches) long near the base of the plant, shorter farther up the stem.

One plant can produce as many as 50 small yellow flower heads in a narrow, elongate array at the top of the plant.

References

External links
Alabama Plant Atlas

tarda
Flora of the Northeastern United States
Flora of the Southeastern United States
Plants described in 1813
Taxa named by Kenneth Kent Mackenzie
Taxa named by John Kunkel Small